Ana Blanco López (born 27 May 1961) is a Spanish journalist and newscaster. Since 1991 she has anchored the three main editions of Televisión Española's flagship newscast Telediario.

Career
Blanco started her career in radio in 1980 as a contributor of Cadena SER, later in 1989 she debuted in television as host, along with Agustín Bravo, of the cultural-oriented program Zip-zap in Telemadrid.

In 1990 Blanco joined TVE, working in different areas until the following year, when she debuted as anchor of the weekend editions of Telediario along with Francine Gálvez. She is one of the longest running presenters in the history of Telediario, celebrating 30 years in the newscast in 2020. On 29 August 2022, RTVE announced Blanco was quitting from the newscast services.

Awards
ATV award for best news anchor (2000, 2004,2005, 2010 and 2012)
Antena de Oro award in 1999
Golden TP Award as best news anchor (2007 and 2008)

References

Living people
People from Portugalete
Spanish journalists
Spanish television personalities
1961 births